The Ministry of Public Works and Transport is the government ministry responsible for public works and transport in Cambodia.  The Ministry is mandated to "build, maintain and manage all the transportation infrastructure such as roads, bridges, ports, railways, waterways and buildings" in the nation.  Ministry offices are located in Phnom Penh.

Organization

External links
Ministry of Public Works and Transport
Kampuchea Shipping Agency and Brokers (KAMSAB)

References

Government ministries of Cambodia
Transport in Cambodia
Cambodia
Phnom Penh
Cambodia
Transport organisations based in Cambodia